Clithon is a genus of freshwater snails or brackish snails that have an operculum, aquatic gastropod molluscs in the family Neritidae, the nerites.

Distribution 
Distribution of the genus Clithon includes the Comoro Islands (3 species), Madagascar (3 or more species) and the Mascarene Islands.

Description 
Some species, such as Clithon coronatum have spines on its shell.

Species 

Species in the genus Clithon include:
 
 Clithon angulosum (Récluz, 1843)
 Clithon aspersum (G. B. Sowerby II, 1849)
 † Clithon avellana (Récluz, 1842)
 Clithon barbei Symonds & Pacaud, 2010 †
 † Clithon bezieri (Dalimier, 1918) 
 Clithon bicolor (Récluz, 1843)
 † Clithon bouryi (Cossmann, 1888) 
 † Clithon bristowi (Wenz, 1929)
 Clithon castanea (Hombron & Jacquinot, 1848)
 Clithon celatum (Récluz, 1846)
 Clithon chlorostoma (G.B. Sowerby I, 1833)
 Clithon circumvolutum (Récluz, 1843)
 † Clithon coeuvrense Vrinat, 2019 
 † Clithon concavum (J. Sowerby, 1823) 
 Clithon corona (Linnaeus, 1758)
 Clithon coronatum (Leach, 1815)
 † Clithon cranmorense Symonds, 2006 
 Clithon cryptum Eichhorst, 2016
 Clithon cuvieriana
 Clithon diadema (Récluz, 1841)
 Clithon dispar (Pease, 1868)
 Clithon dominguense (Lamarck, 1822)
 Clithon donovani (Récluz, 1843)
 Clithon dringii (Récluz, 1846)
 Clithon elegans (Deshayes, 1824) †
 Clithon eudeli (G. B. Sowerby III, 1917)
 Clithon faba G. B. Sowerby I, 1836
 Clithon flavovirens (von dem Busch, 1843)
 Clithon francoisi (Mabille, 1895)
 Clithon fuliginosum (von dem Busch, 1843)
 † Clithon hillae ' Symonds, 2015 †
 † Clithon inequidentatum (Récluz, 1850) 
 Clithon leachii (Récluz, 1841)
 Clithon lentiginosum (Reeve, 1855)
 Clithon luctuosum (Récluz, 1841)
 Clithon madecassinum (Morelet, 1860)
 Clithon mertonianum (Récluz, 1843)
 Clithon michaudi (Récluz, 1841)
 † Clithon mortoni Symonds, 2015 
 Clithon nigrispinis Lesson, 1831
 Clithon nouletianus (Gassies, 1863) 
 Clithon nucleolus (Morelet, 1857)
 †Clithon nucleus (Deshayes, 1832) 
 † Clithon occultatum Vrinat, 2019 
 Clithon olivaceum (Récluz, 1843)
 Clithon oualaniense (Lesson, 1831)
 Clithon parvulum (Le Guillou, 1841)
 † Clithon passyanum (Deshayes, 1864) 
 Clithon peguense (Blanford, 1867)
 † Clithon pisiforme (Férussac, 1823) 
 † Clithon planulatum (F. E. Edwards in Lowry, 1866) 
 † Clithon pococki Symonds, 2015 
 Clithon pritchardi (Dohrn, 1861)
 Clithon pulchellum (Récluz, 1843)
 Clithon rarispina (Mousson, 1849)
 Clithon recluzianum (Le Guillou, 1841)
 Clithon reticulare (G. B. Sowerby I, 1836)
 Clithon retropictum (von Martens, 1879)
 Clithon rugatum (Récluz, 1842)
 Clithon ruginosum (Récluz, 1841)
 † Clithon saincenyense (Deshayes, 1864) 
 † Clithon sobrinum (A. Férussac, 1823)
  Clithon souleyetanum (Récluz, 1842)
 Clithon sowerbianum (Récluz, 1843)
 Clithon spiniferum (Récluz, 1842)
 Clithon spinosum (G. B. Sowerby I, 1825) - synonyms: Clithon spinosus, Clithon spinosa
 Clithon squarrosum (Récluz, 1843)
 † Clithon stintoni Symonds, 2009 
 Clithon subgranosum (G. B. Sowerby I, 1836)
 Clithon subpunctatum (Récluz, 1843)
 Clithon teres Eichhorst, 2016
 Clithon thermophilum (Martens, 1878)
 † Clithon tigrinum Vrinat, 2019 †
 † Clithon transbaicalicus Popova, 1981 
 Clithon triseriale (G. B. Sowerby I, 1836) (taxon inquirendum)
 Clithon tritonense (Le Guillou, 1841) (taxon inquirendum)
 Clithon undatus Lesson, 1831 
 Clithon wallacei (Dohrn, 1861)
 † Clithon waltoni (Symonds, 2002) 
 † Clithon zonarium (Deshayes, 1832) 

Species brought into synonymy
 Clithon exclamationis (Mabille, 1895): synonym of Clithon bicolor (Récluz, 1843)
 Clithon glabratum (G.B. Sowerby II, 1849): synonym of Vitta glabrata (G. B. Sowerby II, 1849)
 Clithon longispina (Récluz, 1841): synonym of Clithon coronatum (Leach, 1815) (junior synonym)

Ecology 
It lives in rapid streams.

References 

 Le Guillou, E., 1841. Description de quatorze Nerites nouvelles. Revue Zoologique par la Société Cuvierienne 4: 343-347
 Mabille, J., 1895. Mollusques des Nouvelles-Hébrides recueillis par M. le Docteur François. Bulletin de la Société d'Histoire naturelle d'Autun 8: 393-411
 Eichhorst T.E. (2016). Neritidae of the world. Volume 1. Harxheim: Conchbooks. 695 pp

External links 
 Montfort P. [Denys de. (1808-1810). Conchyliologie systématique et classification méthodique des coquilles. Paris: Schoell. Vol. 1: pp. lxxxvii + 409 [1808]. Vol. 2: pp. 676 + 16]

Neritidae
Gastropod genera